Williston High School is a public high school located in Williston, North Dakota. It currently serves about 1,000 students and is a part of the  Williston Basin School District 7. The official school colors are orange and black and the athletic teams are known as the Coyotes.

The historic school building of Williston High School at 612 1st Ave. W. was listed on the U.S. National Register of Historic Places in 2011.

It was in the Williston Public School District 1 until it merged with Williams County School District 8 into the Williston Basin School District 7 in 2021. Prior to 2021, District 8, which was K-8 only, sent high school students to Williston High.

Campus
By July 2019 the school had a machine that makes espressos.

Athletics

Championships
State Class 'A' boys' basketball: 1948, 1963, 1968, 1975
State Class 'A' girls' basketball: 1975, 1976, 1977
State Class 'A' football: 1917, 1919, 1920
State Class 'A' wrestling: 1958, 1959, 1985, 1999
State Class 'A' volleyball: 2004
State Class 'A' cross country: 1979, 1980, 1984, 2004
State Class A cross country girls: 2020, 2021, 2022
State Class 'A' baseball: 2008
State Class 'A' girls' tennis: 1980, 1981, 1999

Demographics
99% White
.8% Native American
.1% African American
.1% Asian

Notable alumni
Quentin N. Burdick, Lawyer and former senator and congressman
Virgil Hill, professional boxer
Phil Jackson, Naismith Memorial Basketball Hall of Fame coach and former NBA player
Brent Qvale, NFL tackle
Brian Qvale, professional basketball player

References

External links
Williston High School website

Public high schools in North Dakota
Schools in Williams County, North Dakota
North Dakota High School Activities Association (Class A)
North Dakota High School Activities Association (Class AAA Football)
Williston, North Dakota
National Register of Historic Places in Williams County, North Dakota